The 2000 Australian Nations Cup Championship was an Australian motor racing competition for Nations Cup cars. The championship, which was organised by Procar Australia, is recognised by the Confederation of Australian Motor Sport as the inaugural Australian Nations Cup Championship. The year 2000 marked the first season in which the High Performance cars from the Australian GT Production Car Championship were to contest their own separate series under the Nations Cup name.

The championship was won by Jim Richards driving a Porsche 911 GT3 Type 996.

Calendar

The championship was contested over eight rounds.

Points system
Championship points were awarded on a 15-12-10-8-6-5-4-3-2-1 basis for the first ten outright positions.
An additional point was awarded for pole position.

Championship standings

References

External links
 Image of the Porsche 911 GT3 of championship winner Jim Richards, www.airpowersystems.com, as archived at web.archive.org

Australian Nations Cup Championship
Nations Cup Championship